There have been several elective constituencies called Ayr:

 Ayr, Carrick and Cumnock (UK Parliament constituency); since 2005
 Ayr (UK Parliament constituency); 1950-2005
 Ayr Burghs (UK Parliament constituency); 1708-1950
 Ayr (Parliament of Scotland constituency); 1567-1708
 Ayr and Renfrew (Commonwealth Parliament constituency); 1654-1669
 Ayr (Scottish Parliament constituency); since 1999

See also
 Ayrshire (constituency)
 Ayr (disambiguation)

Constituencies in the United Kingdom
Parliament of Scotland